Merve is a feminine Turkish given name of Arabic origin.
It has two meanings:
 Pebble
 One of the two sacred hills in Mecca, Saudi Arabia between which Muslims travel back and forth seven times as part of the ritual pilgrimages. Merve is mentioned in sura of Bakara, verse 158.

According to General Directorate of Civil Registration and Nationality of Turkey, Merve was the most popular female name between 1991 and 2000.

People

Some of the known people with this name are:
 Merve Adıyaman (born 1994), Turkish handball player
 Merve Aladağ (born 1993), Turkish women's football striker
 Merve Aydın (born 1990), Turkish middle distance runner
 Merve Aydın (basketball) (born 1994), Turkish basketball player
 Merve Boluğur (born 1987), Turkish actress
 Merve Dalbeler (born 1987), Turkish volleyball player
 Merve Kavakçı (born 1968), Turkish politician
 Merve Kuryluk (born 1937), Canadian male ice hockey player
 Merve Lowien (born 1937), German publisher and author
 Merve Nur Eroğlu (born 1993), Turkish Paralympic archer
 Merve Sevi (born 1987), Turkish actress
 Merve Erez (born 1986), Turkish composer
 Merve Tanıl (born 1990), Turkish volleyball player
 Merve Terzioğlu (1987-2008), Turkish swimmer
 Merve Tuncel (born 2005), Turkish swimmer
 Safa Merve Nalçacı (born 1993), Turkish women's footballer

Institutions
 Merve Verlag, German publishing house founded by Merve Lowien and others

References

Turkish feminine given names

tr:Merve